The terms Hebrews (Hebrew:  / , Modern:  / , Tiberian:  / ; ISO 259-3:  / ) and Hebrew people are mostly considered synonymous with the Semitic-speaking Israelites, especially in the pre-monarchic period when they were still nomadic. However, in some instances it may also be used in a wider sense, referring to the Phoenicians, or to other ancient groups, such as the group known as Shasu of Yhw on the eve of the Bronze Age collapse, which appears 34 times within 32 verses of the Hebrew Bible. It is sometimes regarded as an ethnonym and sometimes not.

By the time of the Roman Empire, Greek Hebraios could refer to the Jews in general, as Strong's Hebrew Dictionary puts it, "any of the Jewish Nation", and at other times more specifically to the Jews living in Judea. In early Christianity, the Greek term  refers to Jewish Christians as opposed to the gentile Christians and Judaizers (Acts 6:1 among others).  is the province where the Temple was located.

In Armenian, Italian, Greek, the Kurdish languages, Old French, Serbian, Russian, Romanian and a few other languages, the transfer of the name from "Hebrew" to "Jew" never took place, and "Hebrew" is the primary word used for a Jew.

With the revival of the Hebrew language and the emergence of the Hebrew Yishuv, the term has been applied to the Jewish people of this re-emerging society in Israel or the Jewish people in general.

Etymology
The definitive origin of the term "Hebrew" remains uncertain. The biblical term Ivri, meaning "to traverse" or "to pass over", is usually rendered as Hebrew in English, from the ancient Greek Ἑβραῖος and the Latin Hebraeus. The biblical word Ivri has the plural form Ivrim, or Ibrim.

The most generally accepted hypothesis today is that the text intends ivri as the adjective (Hebrew suffix -i) formed from ever (עֵבֶר) 'beyond, across' (avar (עָבַר) 'to cross, to traverse'), as a description of migrants 'from across the river' as the Bible describes the Hebrews. It is also supported by the 3rd century BCE Septuagint, which translates ivri to perates (περατής), a Greek word meaning "one who came across, a migrant", from perao (περάω) "to cross, to traverse", as well as some early traditional commentary. Gesenius considers it the only linguistically acceptable hypothesis. The description of peoples and nations from their location "from across the river" (often the river Euphrates, sometimes the Jordan River) was common in this region of the ancient Near-East: it appears as eber nari in Akkadian and avar nahara in Aramaic (both corresponding to Hebrew ever nahar), the Aramaic expression's use being quoted verbatim in the Bible, for example in an Aramaic letter sent to the King of Persia in the Book of Ezra or in the Book of Nehemiah, sometimes rendered as Trans-Euphrates.

 refers to Shem, the elder brother of Ham and Japheth, and thus the first-born son of Noah, as the father of the sons of Eber (עבר), which may have a similar meaning.

Some authors argue that Ibri denotes the descendants of the biblical patriarch Eber (Hebrew עבר), son of Shelah, a great-grandson of Noah and an ancestor of Abraham, hence the occasional anglicization Eberites.

Since the 19th-century CE discovery of the second-millennium BCE inscriptions mentioning the Habiru, many theories have linked these to the Hebrews. Some scholars argue that the name "Hebrew" is related to the name of those semi-nomadic Habiru people recorded in Egyptian inscriptions of the 13th and 12th centuries BCE as having settled in Egypt. Other scholars rebut this, proposing that the Hebrews are mentioned in later texts of the 3rd Intermediate Period of Egypt (11th century BCE) as Shasu of Yhw, while some scholars consider these two hypotheses compatible, Ḫabiru being a generic Akkadian form parallel to Hebrew ʿivri from the Akkadian equivalent of ʿever "beyond, across" describing foreign peoples "from across the river", where the letter ayin (ע) in Hebrew corresponds to ḫ in Akkadian (as in Hebrew zeroaʿ corresponding to Akkadian zuruḫ).

Use as synonym for "Israelites"

In , Abraham (Abram) is described as a descendant of Eber; Josephus states "Eber" was the patriarch that Hebrew was named after proceeding from the Tower of Babel at the time of Eber's son Peleg, from which Hebrew would eventually become derived.

In , Abraham is described as Avram Ha-Ivri ("Abram the Hebrew"), which translates literally as "Abram the one who stands on the other side."

Israelites are defined as the descendants of Jacob/Israel, son of Isaac, grandson of Abraham. Eber, an ancestor of Jacob (seven generations removed), is a distant ancestor of many peoples, including the Israelites, Ishmaelites, Edomites, Moabites, Ammonites, Midianites, Amalekites and Qahtanites.

According to the Jewish Encyclopedia the terms Hebrews and Israelites usually describe the same people, stating that they were called Hebrews before the conquest of the Land of Canaan and Israelites afterwards. Professor Nadav Na'aman and others say that the use of the word "Hebrew" to refer to Israelites is rare and when used it is used "to Israelites in exceptional and precarious situations, such as migrants or slaves."

Use as synonym for "Jews" 

By the Roman period, "Hebrews" could be used to designate the Jews, who use the Hebrew language. The Epistle to the Hebrews, one of the books of the New Testament, was probably directed at Jewish Christians.

In some modern languages, including Armenian, Greek, Italian, Romanian, and many Slavic languages, the name Hebrews (with linguistic variations) is the standard ethnonym for Jews; but in many other languages in which both terms exist, it is currently considered derogatory to call Jews "Hebrews".

Among certain left-wing or liberal circles of Judaic cultural lineage, the word "Hebrew" is used as an alternatively secular description of the Jewish people (e.g., Bernard Avishai's The Hebrew Republic or left-wing wishes for a "Hebrew-Arab" joint cultural republican state).

Use in Zionism 

Beginning in the late 19th century, the term "Hebrew" became popular among secular Zionists; in this context the word alluded to the transformation of the Jews into a strong, independent, self-confident secular national group ("the New Jew") sought by classical Zionism. This use died out after the establishment of the state of Israel, when "Hebrew" was replaced with "Jew" or "Israeli".

References

Bibliography 
Ancient Judaism, Max Weber, Free Press, 1967, 

Richard Kugelman, "Hebrew, Israelite, Jew in the New Testament." In The Bridge: A Yearbook of Judaeo-Christian Studies, Vol. 1, edited by John M. Oesterreicher and Barry Ulanov, 204–224. New York: Pantheon Books, 1955.

External links 

 
Ancient peoples of the Near East
Canaan
Hebrew Bible nations
Semitic-speaking peoples